Shootout at Alair is an Indian Telugu-language based crime drama web series streaming on ZEE5 platform since 25 December 2020. The 8-episodes web series is written and directed by Anand Ranga. The web series is produced under Gold Box Entertainment which was established by Sushmita Konidela with her husband Vishnu Prasad. It stars Prakash Raj and Srikanth.

Synopsis 
Starting in 2007, on the anniversary of Mecca Masjid blasts, a terrorist named Akhtar is suspected to be killing Hindu policemen every year. However, Akthar is believed to be a slain terrorist who was killed five years ago in an encounter. When a similar incident repeats at the blast site many years after the encounter, the police wonders if Akhtar is still alive.

Cast 

 Prakash Raj as DSP Suryanarayana
 Srikanth as IG Praveen Chand
 Kranthi Kiran Kamaraju as Akthar's brother
 Sampath Raj
 Nandini Rai as Muslim girl Nafisa
 Saranya
 Teja Kakumanu as Akhtar
 Ravi Kale
 Rajiv Kumar Aneja as Lawyer

Episodes list

Release date 
The web series was digitally launched on ZEE5 Platform on 25 December 2020.

Reception

Critical reviews 
On 29 December 2020, Pakaao rated the web series with 8/10 stars. With a review that Shootout at Alair is a good watch portraying the police force and their never-ending spirit to protect people. It also showcases how police officers maintain a balance between their professional & personal lives alongside everyday challenges. Displaying a complete picturization of their personal lives that includes their family that forms the core of the series. The performance of all the actors in the series is worthy of applause. The cinematography, rustic locations, and music by Naresh Kumaran are just right, and feel good throughout the series.

123telugu gave 3.25/5 stars to the series. Stating that it is an intense series based on true events. Anyway, the first few episodes were not that good, the following episodes got the viewers pinned with narration and carry on with the same feeling till the end. The series is a true tribute to all the sincere cops who lost their lives in countering the terrorists. Showing appreciation for Anand Ranga in bringing up such a sensitive and crucial concept once again. Actors like Srikanth, Teja Kakumanu & Prakash Raj did a fine job while Nandini Rai and Gayathri Gupta's performance were decent.

On 26 December 2020, Binged criticized Shootout at Alair by giving 5.5/10 stars. Pointing out an issue with the direction of the web series. They stated that the way a particular scene is set, and what happens within the scene is utterly mundane, boring and repetitive. Although, highlights of the web series were the mid-season episodes, that displayed police bravery and presents the overall story. On the other hand, a few drawbacks were the opening of a few episodes that seemed rushed, but the ending is precise and the narrative becomes quite understandable.

References

External links 
 Shootout at Alair on ZEE5
 

2020 Indian television series debuts
2020 Indian television series endings
Telugu-language web series
Indian web series
Indian crime television series
ZEE5 original programming